Bursa Malaysia is the stock exchange of Malaysia. It is one of the largest bourses in ASEAN. It is based in Kuala Lumpur and was previously known as the Kuala Lumpur Stock Exchange (KLSE). It provides a full integration of transactions, offering a wide range of currency exchange and related services including trading, settlement, clearing and savings services.

Along with the Securities Commission of Malaysia, the stock exchange regulates the capital market in Malaysia and through its facilities, upholds the duty to manage and maintain order in the trading of stocks, bonds and derivatives.

History 
Bursa Malaysia was established in 1930 when the Singapore Stockbrokers Association became an official organization of securities in Malaya. In 1937, it was re-registered as the Stockbrokers' Association of Malaya, but it still did not trade public shares. In 1960, the Malayan Stock Exchange was formed and public trading started on May 9 that year. In 1961, a board system was introduced in two trading places, one in Singapore and one in Kuala Lumpur.

The Malaysian Stock Exchange was formally formed in 1964 and in the following year, with the separation of Singapore from Malaysia, the stock exchange continued to function under the Malaysian and Singapore Stock Exchange (MSSE). In 1973, with the termination of currency exchange between Malaysia and Singapore, MSSE split into two which is the Kuala Lumpur Stock Exchange (KLSE) and the Stock Exchange of Singapore (SES).

Kuala Lumpur Stock Exchange (KLSE) was renamed Bursa Malaysia in 2004 and it consists of a Main Market, ACE Market and LEAP Market.

See also 
 Economy of Malaysia
 List of Southeast Asian stock exchanges
 List of stock exchanges in the Commonwealth of Nations
 List of stock exchanges

References

External links 

 

 
Financial services companies established in 1964
Economy of Malaysia
Ministry of Finance (Malaysia)
Companies listed on Bursa Malaysia
Minister of Finance (Incorporated) (Malaysia)
Government-owned companies of Malaysia
1964 establishments in British Malaya
1964 establishments in Malaysia
Stock exchanges in Southeast Asia